Maximiliano Daniel Biancucchi Cuccittini (born 15 September 1984), is an Argentine former footballer who played as a forward.

Career

Early career
He started his career playing for San Lorenzo of Argentina. He also played for Paraguayan clubs, including Sportivo Luqueño, where he won the 2006–07 Apertura Championship of the Liga Paraguaya, before joining Brazilian club Flamengo, in July 2007.

Flamengo
He played his first match as a Flamengo player on 5 August 2007, a Brazilian Série A match against Santos at Estádio Vila Belmiro, in which he came on as a substitute for Roger. And scored his first goal in a 1–0 win over rivals Fluminense in the 2007 Brazilian Série A.

Maxi ranks sixteenth in a number of appearances by a foreigner for Flamengo in the club's history.

Cruz Azul
He joined Cruz Azul of Mexico in 2010. Maxi scored his first goal for Cruz Azul against Deportivo Toluca. After he scored another goal against Tigres. He later scored 2 goals for Cruz Azul on the 2010–11 CONCACAF Champions League.

Vitória
On 15 January 2013, Maxi signed with Vitória, returning to Brazilian football after about four years.

Bahia
He and his brother Emanuel joined Bahia on 9 January 2014.

Ceará
He started playing for Ceará on 16 January 2017.

Personal life
He is the cousin of Paris Saint-Germain forward Lionel Messi (the son of his mother's sister) and the older brother of Emanuel Biancucchi of Vila Nova in Brazil. He is also nicknamed "El primo de Messi" (Messi's cousin).

Career statistics

Honours
Sportivo Luqueño
Liga Paraguaya Apertura: 2007

Flamengo
Taça Guanabara: 2008
Taça Rio: 2009
Campeonato Carioca: 2009
Série A: 2009

Olimpia
Liga Paraguaya Clausura: 2011

Vitória
Campeonato Baiano: 2013

Ceará
Campeonato Cearense: 2017

References

External links
 Bio at Brazilian FA database
 Player Profile@ Flamengo.com
 Profile at footballzz.co.uk
 Maxi Biancucchi on Soccerway

1984 births
Living people
Footballers from Rosario, Santa Fe
Argentine footballers
Argentine people of Italian descent
Argentine expatriate footballers
San Lorenzo de Almagro footballers
Club Libertad footballers
Sportivo Luqueño players
CR Flamengo footballers
General Caballero Sport Club footballers
Cruz Azul footballers
Club Olimpia footballers
Esporte Clube Vitória players
Esporte Clube Bahia players
Ceará Sporting Club players
Argentine Primera División players
Liga MX players
Campeonato Brasileiro Série A players
Expatriate footballers in Brazil
Expatriate footballers in Mexico
Expatriate footballers in Paraguay
Argentine expatriate sportspeople in Brazil
Argentine expatriate sportspeople in Mexico
Association football forwards